Manu Manzo (born in Caracas, April 14, 1994) is an American singer-songwriter, who was born in Venezuela and raised in Miami, United States.

Career 
After attending Berklee College of Music for two years, she released her first six-track EP titled Como Soy in 2014, produced by Juan Carlos Perez-Soto. She collaborated in the composition with Tommy Torres, Luis Enrique, Alex Ubago, Elsten Torres, Cris Zalles and Perez-Soto.

Manzo was nominated for "Best New Artist" at the 2015 Latin Grammy Awards.

Manzo signed a publishing deal with Peer Music in 2016.

In 2018, Manzo signed a recording contract and co-management with Universal Music Latin Entertainment.

References

1994 births
Living people
Venezuelan emigrants to the United States
American women singers
American women songwriters
Berklee College of Music alumni
21st-century American women